Cymothoe radialis is a butterfly in the family Nymphalidae. It is found in Cameroon.

This species has a wingspan of 50 mm. The holotype was provided by the collector Von Stetten from the Moloundou district in southern Cameroon.

References

Butterflies described in 1916
Cymothoe (butterfly)
Endemic fauna of Cameroon
Butterflies of Africa